The Streu is a river of Thuringia and Bavaria, Germany.

The Streu arises in Thuringian part of the Rhön Mountains, below the Ellenbogen mountain, northwest of Melpers. It flows southeast for about  through Ostheim to Mellrichstadt, then flows southwest for another  to join the Franconian Saale at Heustreu near Bad Neustadt. This region is known locally as the Streutal.

The Streu is too small and shallow for navigation but its lower reaches below Mellrichstadt are suitable for light boating and kayaking. The Streu occasionally floods, especially in spring when the snow melts on the Rhön Mountains. These floods are not generally destructive in the Streutal, but can contribute to more serious flooding downstream on the Franconian Saale.

See also
List of rivers of Thuringia
List of rivers of Bavaria

References

Rivers of Thuringia
Rivers of Bavaria
Schmalkalden-Meiningen
Rhön-Grabfeld
Rivers of Germany